The Melbourne Aces all-time roster is a list of people who have played at least one  regular season game# for the Melbourne Aces, of the Australian Baseball League, along with their primary position.

Aces All-time roster

Aces All-time managers

Aces All-time coaching staff

References 

Australian Baseball League team rosters
Melbourne Aces